Aleksa Damjanac (born 20 October 1998) is a Serbian footballer who plays as a centre-back.

Career
For the second half of 2016–17, Damjanac signed for RCD Mallorca in the Spanish second division, failing to make an appearance but winning the Spanish fourth division with their reserves, which he considers the highlight of his career.

After failing to make an appearance for Belgian side Mouscron as well as Partizan, Damjanac signed for Grafičar Beograd in the Serbian second division.

He is the son of former player Nikola.

References

External links
 

1998 births
Living people
Serbian footballers
Association football defenders
OFK Beograd players
RCD Mallorca B players
Royal Excel Mouscron players
RFK Grafičar Beograd players
FK Teleoptik players
FK Radnički 1923 players
Serbian SuperLiga players
Serbian First League players
Serbian expatriate footballers
Expatriate footballers in Spain
Serbian expatriate sportspeople in Spain
Expatriate footballers in Belgium
Serbian expatriate sportspeople in Belgium